Eliran Elkayam (born  October 30, 1976) is an Israeli football player.

External links
  Profile and biography of Eliran Elkayam on Maccabi Haifa's official website
  Profile and statistics of Eliran Elkayam on One.co.il

1976 births
Living people
Israeli Jews
Israeli footballers
Association football defenders
Maccabi Haifa F.C. players
Maccabi Petah Tikva F.C. players
Hapoel Haifa F.C. players
Hapoel Petah Tikva F.C. players
Hapoel Nof HaGalil F.C. players
Bnei Yehuda Tel Aviv F.C. players
Beitar Tel Aviv Bat Yam F.C. players
Maccabi Kafr Kanna F.C. players
Maccabi Ironi Kiryat Ata F.C. players
Liga Leumit players
Israeli Premier League players
Footballers from Kiryat Ata
Israeli people of Moroccan-Jewish descent